Maurice Saul Argent (4 March 1916 – 7 December 1981) was a character actor from Pennsylvania who acted between 1957 and 1980. In addition to his film roles (below), he is remembered for his stage performances with the San Francisco Actor's Workshop. He played the title role in the Workshop's widely hailed 1953 production of Arthur Miller's Death of a Salesman.

He taught stagecraft to generations of San Francisco teens at George Washington High School and Lowell High School.

Argent died in San Francisco, California on 7 December 1981 at age 65.

Filmography

References

External links

1916 births
1981 deaths
American male film actors
20th-century American male actors